The Book of Letters or The Book of Messages() is an Armenian collection of church and religious documents of the 7th century. Includes authentic correspondence of church figures from Armenia, Georgia, Iran, etc. 

It is assumed that the main part of the collection was compiled by Catholicos Komitas Aghtsetsi (615-628). Later, 98 more documents (letters) were added, which chronologically cover the period of the 5th-13th centuries. The oldest document is a letter from the Archbishop of Constantinople Proclus to Sahak Partev. The compilation of the collection was due to the struggle of the Armenian Church against Chalcedonism. The Book of Letters is an important historical source for revealing the history of the Armenian Church in the early Middle Ages. The materials of the collection also contain important information about other countries of the Transcaucasus - Georgia and Caucasian Albania, valuable data on the social terminology of the time

References 

Armenian culture 
Armenian Apostolic Church